The province of Massa-Carrara is a province in the Tuscany region of central Italy. It is named after the provincial capital Massa, and Carrara, the other main town in the province.

History

The province of "Massa e Carrara" was born in 1859 from the separation of the Lunigiana and the Garfagnana from the Duchy of Modena. Originally it was composed of three circondari: I° "Circondario of Massa and Carrara" (a group of seven districts divided in 14 municipalities), II° "Circondario" of Castelnuovo Garfagnana (four districts divided in 17 municipalities), III° "Circondario" of Pontremoli (three districts divided into six municipalities).

Until the census of 1861, the province appears as part of Compartimento territorial Modena, Reggio and Massa, but since the census of the population of 1871 it has been counted as part of Tuscany. Later, with the "Regio Decreto n. 1913 of September 2, 1923", the municipalities of Calice al Cornoviglio and Rocchetta Vara were detached from the province and added to the new province of La Spezia. In the same period ("Regio Decreto n.2490 of November 9, 1923") the 17 municipalities of the "Circondario" Castelnuovo Garfagnana were removed from Emilia and assigned to the province of Lucca, in order to compensate for the passage to the new province of Pistoia of all the municipalities of the Val di Nievole.

The province of Massa and Carrara was left crippled, waiting for a reorganization. In 1938, the municipalities of Carrara, Massa, and Montignoso joined and became the municipality of Apuania. In the same year, the industrial zone Apuana was instituted, including in relative Consortium C.Z.I.The municipalities of neighboring Versilia and the province assumed the name of a province of Apuania. In 1946, with decree Lieutenant one (Umberto II of Savoia) the new municipality of Apuania was formed, and the province (for error and/or historical ignorance) resumptions the denomination does not date from 1859 when it was "Massa and Carrara" but Massa. This was the name that had been designated to the city of Massa or Massa of Carrara from 1700 until the formation of the Kingdom of Italy (1860), to distinguish it from other homonymous cities.

In 2009, both decrees of 1938 and  1946 were abolished, restoring the old name.

Geography and administration
There are 17 comuni (singular: comune) in the province.

Government

List of presidents of the province of Massa and Carrara

Economy
The province's economical relevance, once mainly based on the production of the famous white Carrara marble, has now shifted to the importation and fabrication of blocks of marble and granite from all over the world.

See also
Carrara
Duchy of Massa and Carrara
Lunigiana
Marble
Massa
Ducal Palace of Massa, home of the local authority

References

External links

Official website 

 
M
Massa-Carrara